Pine Tree Independent School District is a public school district based in Longview, Texas in the United States.  Pine Tree ISD serves western portions of Longview, including areas that were once Greggton, and small section of the neighboring city of White Oak.

In 2018, the school district was rated "Met Standard" for district, Primary, Parkway Elementary, Birch Elementary, Middle School, Junior High, High School and ExCEL (alternative).  Distinction designations:  Pine Tree High School - Academic Achievement in Science and Parkway Elementary - Academic Achievement in ELA/Reading and Academic Achievement in Mathematics.

Schools
Pine Tree High School (Grades 9-12)
Pine Tree ExCEL High School (Grades 9-12)
Pine Tree Junior High School (Grades 7-8)
Pine Tree Middle School (Grades 5-6)
Pine Tree Birch Elementary School (Grades 1-4)
Pine Tree Parkway Elementary School (Grades 1-4)
Pine Tree Primary School (Grades PK-K)
PACE Discipline Alternative Campus

The district mascot is Pete the Pirate. School colors are blue and gold.

History
Pine Tree, Texas was first settled in the mid-1840s.  The school was operating in the community in the 1850s. Growth was slow but stable, with agriculture being the primary source of income through the turn of the century. By the early 1940s, Pine Tree was an election precinct and a school district. After World War II, Pine Tree became part of Longview.

References

External links

School districts in Gregg County, Texas